Clear Passage Island is an uninhabited island in the Qikiqtaaluk Region of Nunavut, Canada. It lies in Kangilo Fiord, the southern of Baffin Island's Cumberland Sound's two ends (the other being Clearwater Fiord). The False Passage Peninsula lies northwest of the island. Anarnittuq Island, Iglunga Island, and Nunatak Island are in the vicinity.

References

External links 
 Clear Passage Island in the Atlas of Canada - Toporama; Natural Resources Canada

Islands of Baffin Island
Islands of Cumberland Sound
Uninhabited islands of Qikiqtaaluk Region